Live Bait is a Canadian comedy-drama film, released in 1995. The directorial debut of Bruce Sweeney, the film won the award for Best Canadian Feature Film at the 1995 Toronto International Film Festival.

The film stars Tom Scholte as Trevor McIntosh, a 23-year-old man attempting to lose his virginity during the summer after his college graduation, while the relationship of his parents (Babz Chula and Kevin McNulty) is simultaneously faltering.

The film was written as Sweeney's graduate thesis for his MFA in Film Studies at the University of British Columbia.

References

External links
 

1995 films
1995 comedy-drama films
Canadian comedy-drama films
English-language Canadian films
Films directed by Bruce Sweeney
1995 directorial debut films
1990s English-language films
1990s Canadian films